Kiryat Gat, also spelled Qiryat Gat, is a city in the Southern District of Israel. The city hosts one of the most advanced semiconductor fabrication plants in the world, Intel's Fab 28 plant producing 7 nm process chips and the currently under construction Fab 38 planned to open in 2024 and to produce 5 nm process using EUV lithography.

Etymology
Kiryat Gat is named for Gath, one of the five major cities of the Philistines. In Hebrew, "gat" means "winepress". In the 1950s, archaeologists found ruins at a nearby tell (Tel Erani) which were mistaken for the Philistine city of Gath. The location most favored for Gath now is  Tel es-Safi, thirteen kilometers to the northeast.

History

Kiryat Gat was founded in 1954, initially as a ma'abara. The following year it was established as a development town by 18 families from Morocco. It was founded just west of the ruins of the Palestinian Arab village of Iraq al-Manshiyya, which was depopulated in 1949 after the 1948 Arab–Israeli War.  The former location of Iraq al-Manshiyya is now within the built-up area of Kiryat Gat. By 1992, Kiryat Gat had grown and spread also onto the land that formerly belonged to the village of Al-Faluja.

The population of Kiryat Gat rose from 4,400 inhabitants in 1958 to 17,000 in 1969, mostly Jewish immigrants from North Africa. The economy was initially based on processing the agricultural produce of the Lachish region, such as cotton and wool. In December 1972, Kiryat Gat's municipal status was upgraded and it became Israel's 31st city.

During the 1990s, the mass immigration of Soviet Jews to Israel brought many new residents to the town and its population grew to 42,500 by 1995. The development of the Rabin industrial zone on the eastern edge of the city, and the opening of Highway 6 further improved the economy of the city.

Demographics 
In 2012, the ethnic makeup of the city was 93.8 percent Jewish. In its early years, Kiryat Gat was populated mainly by Jews of Sephardi/Mizrahi origin. Since the mass immigration of Soviet Jews, approximately one third of the inhabitants hail from the former Soviet Union.

Economy 

The Polgat textile factory was the main employer in the town until it closed in the 1990s. In 1999, Intel opened a chip fabrication plant, known as Fab 18, to produce Pentium 4 chips and flash memories. Intel received a grant of $525 million from the Israeli government to build the plant. In February 2006, the cornerstone was laid for Intel's second Kiryat Gat plant, Fab 28. Despite this, Kiryat Gat has one of Israel's highest unemployment rates. In 2021, Intel announced a $10 billion investment in new manufacturing in Kiryat Gat.

The headquarters and small-arms (guns) manufacturing facility of Israeli Weapons Industries is now located in Kiryat Gat.

Transportation 

Kiryat Gat is served by the Kiryat Gat Railway Station on the Tel Aviv - Be'er Sheva inter-city line of Israel Railways. Kiryat Gat is situated between two major highways, Highway 40 to the west of the town and Highway 6.

Schools and education 
Kiryat Gat has 25 schools with an enrollment of 10,676. Of these schools, 18 are elementary schools with a student population of 5,498, and 13 are high schools with a student population of 5,178. In 2001, 54.7% of Kiryat Gat's 12th grade students graduated with a  matriculation certificate. Kiryat Gat has a Pedagogic Center, science centers, a computerized library and a center devoted to industry, art and technology. In 2012, a high school student from Kiryat Gat won first prize in the First Step to Nobel Prize in Physics competition.

Twin towns — sister cities
Kiryat Gat is twinned with:
 Buffalo, United States of America (1977)
 Kruševac, Serbia (1990)

Notable people
Tali Fahima (born 1976), pro-Palestinian activist
Adi Nes (born 1966), photographer
Miri Regev (born 1965), politician and a former Brigadier General. She is a member of the Cabinet as the Minister of Culture and Sport from 2015–2020 and the Minister of Transportation since 2020 
Ninet Tayeb (born 1983), singer and actress

See also
 Kefar Shihlayim

References

External links
Official website 

 
Cities in Israel
Cities in Southern District (Israel)
1954 establishments in Israel
Populated places established in 1954